Hiram Bradley Clawson (November 7, 1826 – March 29, 1912) was a Latter-day Saint businessman and Church leader in the 19th and early 20th centuries.

Life and career
Clawson was born in Utica, New York.  He was educated at the Utica Academy. In 1838 he joined the Church of Jesus Christ of Latter-day Saints along with his widowed mother. In 1841 they moved to Nauvoo.

Clawson went west with the Latter-day Saints, arriving in Salt Lake City in 1848. He supervised the building of the first adobe building in Salt Lake City and then was the head mason for the Council House of which Truman Angell was the architect.  Also for a time while Angell was away on a mission Clawson served as acting architect of the Salt Lake Temple.

Clawson was a close associate of Brigham Young and for many years served as his business manager. He also was involved in the building of the Salt Lake Theatre and was often a performer in its plays. Clawson was also for a time manager of the theatre.

Clawson served as an aide-de-camp to Daniel H. Wells in running the Nauvoo Legion in 1850. He later served as adjutant general of the Legion from 1863 until the legion was disbanded in 1870.

In 1865 Clawson bought out William H. Hooper to become partners with Horace S. Eldredge.  Clawson and Eldredge dissolved their firm in 1868 and sold it to Zion's Cooperative Mercantile Institution (ZCMI). Clawson was then the general superintendent of ZCMI from 1868-1873.  After being replaced for a short time by Hooper, Clawson took over the head of ZCMI again from 1874-1875. In 1875 Clawson bought the agriculture, hide and wool departments of ZCMI which he ran as an independent business until 1885.

From 1884 until 1902 Clawson served as the bishop of the Twelfth Ward in Salt Lake City.

Family
Clawson had four wives. His first wife was Ellen Curtis Spencer Clawson, a daughter of Orson Spencer. Among their children was Spencer Clawson who ran unsuccessfully for mayor of Salt Lake City.

Clawson's second wife was Margaret Gay Judd, who was born in Canada. One of their children was Rudger Clawson who was a member of the Quorum of the Twelve. Another of their children, Thomas A. Clawson, became a dentist and served in several callings in the LDS Church including succeeding Orson F. Whitney as bishop of the Eighteenth Ward in Salt Lake City.

Clawson's third wife was Alice Young, a daughter of Brigham Young and Mary Ann Angell.

Clawson's fourth wife was Emily Young, a daughter of Brigham Young and Emily Partridge.

Clawson had a total of forty-two children.

Notes

References
Andrew Jenson. LDS Biographical Encyclopedia, Vol. 1, p. 629.
Richard H. Cracroft and Neal E. Lambert, ed., A Believing People, (Provo: BYU Press, 1974) p. 119.
University of Utah bio of Clawson

External links
 H. B. Clawson certificate, MSS 1167 in the L. Tom Perry Special Collections, Harold B. Lee Library, Brigham Young University
 Hiram B. Clawson Papers at University of Utah Digital Library, Marriott Library Special Collections

1826 births
1912 deaths
19th-century American businesspeople
20th-century American businesspeople
American leaders of the Church of Jesus Christ of Latter-day Saints
Burials at Salt Lake City Cemetery
Businesspeople from Salt Lake City
Businesspeople from Utica, New York
Converts to Mormonism
Latter Day Saints from Illinois
Latter Day Saints from New York (state)
Latter Day Saints from Utah
Mormon pioneers